Julián Farietta (born April 10, 1988 in Bogotá, Colombia), is a Colombian actor and model.

Filmography

References

External links 
 

1988 births
21st-century Colombian male actors
Male actors from Bogotá
Colombian male telenovela actors
Colombian male models
Living people